Béni Haoua District is a district of Chlef Province, Algeria.

Communes 
The district is further divided into 3 communes:

 Béni Haoua
Breira
 Oued Goussine

References 

Districts of Chlef Province